Highway 8 is an Iraqi highway which extends from Baghdad, through  Al Hillah, Al-Qādisiyyah, As Samawah, Nasiriyah, Basrah, to the Kuwait frontier.

Roads in Iraq